The 2012–13 NHL season was the 96th season of operation (95th season of play) of the National Hockey League (NHL). The regular season began on January 19, 2013, and ended on April 28, 2013, with the playoffs to follow until June.

The season start was delayed from its original October 11, 2012, date due to a lockout imposed by the NHL franchise owners after the expiration of the league's collective bargaining agreement (CBA). After a new labour agreement was reached between the owners and the National Hockey League Players' Association (NHLPA), training camps opened on January 13, 2013, and a 48-game season (reduced from 82 games) started on January 19. Similar to the 1994–95 season, the shortened regular season was limited to intra-conference competition. The season calendar opened with the 2012 NHL Entry Draft on June 22–23, 2012, held at the Consol Energy Center in Pittsburgh.

League business

Lockout

On September 13, 2012, all 29 league ownership groups (with the Phoenix Coyotes collectively owned by the NHL) authorized commissioner Gary Bettman to lock out the National Hockey League Players' Association (NHLPA) upon the expiration of the NHL collective bargaining agreement (CBA) on September 15. The action marked the fifth labour dispute in twenty years for the league, following a 1992 strike, lockouts in 1994–95 and 2004–05, as well as a referees lockout in 1993; this is more than any of the other major professional sports leagues in the United States and Canada during this period. In preparation for the lockout, NHL teams assigned all of their eligible players to their American Hockey League farm clubs.

Although Bettman acknowledged the 2005–12 CBA was fair, he also stated that he was demanding concessions as a result of the late 2000s recession, even though the league experienced significant growth at that time. Sports media reported on July 14 on the NHL's first offer to the players. The offer reportedly included: a drop in players' share of "hockey-related revenues" from 57 per cent to 46 per cent; a requirement that players play ten years before becoming an unrestricted free agent (UFA); a limit on players' contracts to five years in length; elimination of salary arbitration; and an extension of entry-level contracts to five years from three.

The NHLPA made an attempt to strike down the lockout as illegal in Alberta and Quebec; the Quebec Labour Board ruled against the NHLPA on September 14.

The NHL season officially entered a lockout after the expiration of the CBA on September 15, 2012, prior to the planned start of the pre-season. Locked-out players immediately began signing with the Kontinental Hockey League (KHL), Czech Extraliga (ELH), the SM-liiga, and the Elitserien (SEL), the last of which largely resisted signing locked-out players. The NHL canceled all regular-season games originally scheduled up to January 14, 2013, including the 2013 NHL Winter Classic. The 2013 NHL All-Star Game was also canceled.

On January 6, 2013, after a 16-hour negotiating session, the owners and players union reached a tentative agreement for a 10-year deal. NHL owners ratified the CBA on January 9, 2013, followed three days later by the deal's ratification by NHLPA members, and the signing of a memorandum of understanding between the two parties, marking their official agreement on the labour pact. The NHL announced a 48-game schedule, starting on January 19, 2013, and ending on April 28, 2013, consisting solely of intra-conference competition.

Proposed realignment
The relocation of the Atlanta Thrashers from the American southeast to the Canadian prairies, where the franchise is now known as the Winnipeg Jets, in the summer of 2011 resulted in discussions within the league on how to realign the league's 30 teams. Following several months of speculation, the NHL's Board of Governors voted in favor of a radical realignment plan that would have reduced the six current divisions in two conferences into four conferences. The top four teams in each conference would then qualify for the 2013 Stanley Cup playoffs, while for the regular season, each team would face its non-conference opponents twice: once each at home and on the road. Conference opponents would face each other five or six times each. The plan was designed to better balance each grouping of teams by time zone, as well as to cut the costs of travel western teams face.

However, on January 6, 2012, the league announced that the National Hockey League Players' Association (NHLPA) had rejected the proposed realignment, delaying any future changes until at least 2013–14. NHLPA officers expressed a desire to see a draft schedule for the realignment, which the league had not completed.

Salary cap
The NHL announced the revised salary cap on June 28, 2012. The salary cap figure is in effect until the end of the current collective bargaining agreement (CBA) with the Player's Association. The salary cap for players' salaries rose $5.9 million (USD) to $70.2 million per franchise. The salary floor, the minimum which franchises must spend, rose to $54.2 million.

As part of the newly agreed upon CBA, the salary cap for teams will be $64.3 million per franchise, with a floor of $44 million.

Change of venue
On October 24, 2012, the New York Islanders announced that the team had signed a 25-year lease with the Barclays Center in Brooklyn, starting in 2015 after the team's current lease for the Nassau Veterans Memorial Coliseum expires. The arena, originally constructed as the home for the National Basketball Association's Brooklyn Nets, was intended to be expanded to meet NHL standards.

Rule changes
With the ratification of the new collective bargaining agreement, several rule changes took effect this season.

Officials no longer had to be certain that contact had been made with the hands (as opposed to the stick) in deciding whether or not to assess a slashing minor.
Making contact with the opponent's facemask will result in a minor penalty.
Both players facing-off are prohibited from batting the puck with their hand in an attempt to win the face-off. Any attempt by either center to win the face-off by batting the puck with their hand shall result in a minor penalty. This penalty shall be announced as a "Minor Penalty for Delay of Game - Face-off Violation."
Rule 67 has been changed to prevent players from getting a faceoff by putting their glove on the puck anywhere on the ice and not allowing play to continue. A minor penalty will be assessed for "closing his hand on the puck."

Uniforms
To celebrate 20 years in Dallas, the Stars wore special patches this season.
The Tampa Bay Lightning wore special patches to commemorate their 20th season in the NHL. Their alternate uniform was also modified to include the simplified logo they introduced in the 2011–12 season. 
The San Jose Sharks wore patches in memory of original owner George Gund III, who died January 15, 2013. Gund was instrumental in bringing, removing and returning NHL hockey to the Bay Area.
To celebrate 100 years of hockey on the west coast, the Canucks honored Vancouver's first professional hockey team, the Vancouver Millionaires, who played in the Pacific Coast Hockey Association and the Western Canada Hockey League from 1912 to 1926 by wearing a patch of a re-colored Millionaires logo on their alternate home jerseys. The Canucks also wore throwback uniforms based on the 1915 Vancouver Millionaires in a game against the Detroit Red Wings.
The Buffalo Sabres, Edmonton Oilers and Florida Panthers retired their third jerseys.

Regular season
Originally planned for October 11, 2012, the lockout delay pushed the start of the 2012–13 season to January 19, 2013, with 12 games for the opening night. Each team played 18 games within its division (four or five games for each team) and 30 games against teams in the other division (three games for each team); no interconference games were played during the regular season. The regular season was shortened from 82 games down to 48, canceling 41.5 percent of the full regular season.

Winter Classic
The 2013 NHL Winter Classic was scheduled to feature the Detroit Red Wings hosting the Toronto Maple Leafs at Michigan Stadium (the largest stadium in North America) in Ann Arbor, Michigan, but it was postponed one year due to the labour lockout. The game was played instead on January 1, 2014, at Michigan Stadium.

All-Star Game
Originally scheduled to take place January 27, 2013, in Columbus, Ohio, the All-Star Game was canceled as a result of the ongoing lockout.

European Premiere games
In past seasons, selected NHL teams began their season with exhibition games and the first two regular season games in European cities. In March 2012, the NHL announced that it had decided not to start the season with games in Europe, because of the upcoming Collective Bargaining Agreement negotiations and the surrounding uncertainty.

With the NHL not playing games in Europe, Russia's Kontinental Hockey League (against which the NHL has played several interleague competitions) was instead to come to the United States, with the NHL's blessing; the KHL was to feature two games between Dynamo Moscow and SKA Saint Petersburg at the Barclays Center in Brooklyn on January 19 and 20, 2013. However no agreement between the KHL and the Barclays Center had been signed, and the KHL announced the two games would be held in Russia; due to the NHL lockout, the signing of a 25-year lease with the New York Islanders, and pleas from the teams' fans to keep the games in Russia.

Postponement
 The February 9 game between the Tampa Bay Lightning and Boston Bruins at TD Garden was postponed due to inclement weather in Boston the day of the game.
Two games were affected by the Boston Marathon bombing:
 The April 15 game between the Ottawa Senators and Boston Bruins at TD Garden was postponed due to the bombing earlier that day. The game was rescheduled to April 28, the day after the previous final day of the regular season.
 The April 19 game between the Pittsburgh Penguins and Boston Bruins at TD Garden was postponed to April 20 due to the citywide lockdown as a result of the manhunt for the suspects of the bombing. As a result of the rescheduled Penguins-Bruins game, the game between the Penguins and Buffalo Sabres that was originally scheduled for April 20 was moved to April 23.

Standings
Due to the lockout, each team played 48 games this season, all within their conference.

Attendance

Playoffs

Because of the lockout and delayed start of the shortened regular season, the playoffs did not begin until April 30. The last possible date of Game 7 of the Stanley Cup Finals was then scheduled for June 28.

NHL awards 

Awards were presented during the NHL Awards television specials on June 14–15, 2013. Finalists for voted awards are announced during the playoffs and winners are presented at the awards specials. Voting concluded immediately after the end of the regular season. The President's Trophy, the Prince of Wales Trophy and Campbell Bowls are not presented at the awards specials. The Lester Patrick is announced during the summer and presented in the fall. NHL Network U.S. and NHL Network Canada aired the first part of the awards presentation on June 14, while NBC Sports Network and CBC aired the second part on June 15 preceding Game 2 of the 2013 Stanley Cup Finals.

All-Star teams

Note: Alexander Ovechkin was listed as a Left Wing but played the majority of his games at Right Wing. Some members of the Professional Hockey Writers Association voted for him at Left Wing while others voted for him at Right Wing and consequently, Ovechkin placed twice on the NHL All-Star team.

Player statistics

Scoring leaders
The following players lead the league in points following the conclusion of the regular season.

GP = Games played; G = Goals; A = Assists; Pts = Points; +/– = Plus-minus; PIM = Penalty minutes

Leading goaltenders
The following goaltenders lead the league in goals against average following the conclusion of the regular season while playing at least 1200 minutes.

GP = Games played; Min = Minutes played; W = Wins; L = Losses; OT = Overtime/shootout losses; GA = Goals against; SO = Shutouts; SV% = Save percentage; GAA = Goals against average

Coaching changes

Offseason
Anaheim Ducks: This was Bruce Boudreau's first season as head coach, who replaced Randy Carlyle on November 30, 2011.
Calgary Flames: The Flames decided not to renew Brent Sutter's contract and hired Bob Hartley instead.
Carolina Hurricanes: This was Kirk Muller's first full season as head coach after replacing Paul Maurice, who was fired on November 28, 2011.
Columbus Blue Jackets: This was Todd Richards's first full season as head coach after replacing Scott Arniel, who was fired on January 9, 2012.
Edmonton Oilers: The Oilers decided not to renew Tom Renney's contract and hired Ralph Krueger instead.
Los Angeles Kings: This was Darryl Sutter's first full season after becoming the team's head coach on December 20, 2011. On December 12, 2011, Terry Murray was fired and John Stevens served as interim until Sutter was hired.
Montreal Canadiens: Michel Therrien started his second stint as the Canadiens head coach, after previously coaching the team from 2000 to 2003. The Habs fired Jacques Martin on December 17, 2011, and assistant coach Randy Cunneyworth served as interim head coach for the remainder of the 2011–12 season.
St. Louis Blues: This was Ken Hitchcock's first season as head coach, who replaced Davis Payne on November 6, 2011.
Toronto Maple Leafs: This was Randy Carlyle's first full season as head coach after replacing Ron Wilson, who was fired on March 2, 2012.
Washington Capitals: This was Adam Oates's first season as head coach. Bruce Boudreau was fired on November 28, 2011, and replaced by interim Dale Hunter.

In-season
Buffalo Sabres: Lindy Ruff was fired on February 20, 2013, and replaced by Ron Rolston.
Tampa Bay Lightning: Guy Boucher was fired on March 24, 2013, and replaced by Jon Cooper.

Milestones

First games

The following is a list of notable players who played their first NHL game in 2013, listed with their first team:

Last games

The following is a list of players of note who played their last NHL game in 2012–13, listed with their team:

Major milestones reached

On January 21, 2013, Tampa Bay Lightning forward Vincent Lecavalier participated in his 1,000th NHL game.
On February 4, 2013, Colorado Avalanche forward Milan Hejduk participated in his 1,000th NHL game.
On February 7, 2013, St. Louis Blues defenceman Wade Redden participated in his 1,000th NHL game.
On February 22, 2013, the Chicago Blackhawks set a record by earning at least one point in 17 consecutive games to start a season. The previous record of 16 consecutive games was held by the 2006–07 Anaheim Ducks. The Blackhawks went on to extend the record for consecutive games with a point to start a season to 24 games (21–0–3).
On March 3, 2013, Chicago Blackhawks forward Marian Hossa participated in his 1,000th NHL game.
On March 5, 2013, Montreal Canadiens captain Brian Gionta scored the team's 20,000th NHL goal.
On March 6, 2013, Chicago Blackhawks goaltender Ray Emery becomes the first goaltender in league history to start a season with 10 straight wins. He extended it to 12 straight wins to start a season on March 26.
On March 18, 2013, Philadelphia Flyers defenceman Kimmo Timonen participated in his 1,000th NHL game.
On March 28, 2013, Phoenix Coyotes forward Steve Sullivan participated in his 1,000th NHL game.
On March 29, 2013, Dallas Stars forward Jaromir Jagr recorded his 1,000th career assist, becoming the 12th player in league history and the first non-Canadian to do so.
On March 30, 2013, the Pittsburgh Penguins set a record by becoming the first NHL franchise to win every game during a calendar month. The Penguins defeated the New York Islanders 2–0, winning 15 consecutive games from March 2 until March 30. 
On April 22, 2013, Pittsburgh Penguins goaltender Tomas Vokoun won his 300th NHL game. He became the 28th player in league history to reach this milestone.

Notes
1: Michael Cammalleri had previously scored the 20,000th goal in Canadiens' franchise history on December 28, 2009. Cammalleri's mark included goals from the Canadiens time in the National Hockey Association.

References

External links

2012–13 NHL season Schedule

 
1
1